Robert Thomas Aspromonte (born June 19, 1938) is an American former professional baseball player and business entrepreneur. As well as being the first-ever batter for Houston, he was also the last Brooklyn Dodger to appear in a major league game. He also played for the Atlanta Braves and New York Mets.

After his athletic career, he went on to become a successful businessman in Houston, Texas. In 2019, Aspromonte was among the inaugural class of inductees to the Houston Astros Hall of Fame. In 2005 he was inducted into the Texas Baseball Hall of Fame and in 2011, he was elected to the National Italian American Sports Hall of Fame. He is the younger brother of former MLB player and manager Ken Aspromonte.

Playing career

Early career
Aspromonte was born in Brooklyn, New York where he graduated from Lafayette High School and made his pro debut in the Class A Southern League. In September 1956, the pennant-bound Dodgers placed him on their roster, and on September 19, during a 17–2 triumph over the St. Louis Cardinals at Ebbets Field, Aspromonte made his MLB debut at age 18, striking out as a pinch hitter for Sandy Amoros in the eighth inning. It was Aspromonte's lone appearance in a Brooklyn uniform: he spent the next three seasons in minor league baseball before making the 1960 Los Angeles Dodgers roster out of spring training. On May 5, 1960, his four hits in five at bats, including his first major league home run (off Lew Burdette), led the Dodgers to a come-from-behind win over their rival, the Milwaukee Braves. However, he spent most of the  season in Triple-A, where he batted .329 in the American Association.

The following year, was Aspromonte's first full season in the major leagues. He appeared in 47 games, starting two at third base and three at shortstop, and he hit .241 with two runs batted in in 62 plate appearances.

Houston Astros (1962–1968)
The Dodgers exposed him to the 1961 Major League Baseball expansion draft, and he was selected by the Houston Colt .45s with their second selection, the third player taken overall. In the small amount of games played with the Dodgers, he had been used as a shortstop, but he was moved to third base when with the Astros (with token work at shortstop and the outfield). Aspromonte was the starting third baseman for the Houston franchise (renamed the Astros in 1965) for its first six seasons. On April 10, 1962, Aspromonte, playing third base and inserted into the leadoff position, became the first batter in Houston's MLB history. He singled to left field off Don Cardwell of the Chicago Cubs for the club's first hit, then scored its first-ever MLB run when the next batter, Al Spangler, tripled. Aspromonte would score two more runs that day, as the Colt .45s beat the Cubs, 11–2.
 For the season, he played in 149 games, batting .266/.332/.376 (batting average/OBP/SLG), having 142 hits and 11 home runs with 59 RBIs on 54 strikeouts and 46 walks. He was 2nd in fielding percentage with .967, which was the first of six seasons in a row where he would finish in the top five for all fielders in the National League (which naturally led to him also finishing in top five with putouts and assists).

The following year, he played in 136 games while batting .214/.276/.306 with 100 hits and 49 RBIs on 57 strikeouts and 40 walks as he finished 4th in fielding percentage with .938. He played his most games in a season with 1964, playing 157 while batting .280/.329/.721 while having a career high 155 hits and 69 RBIs while striking out 54 times and walking 35 with a career best and league high .973 fielding percentage. He regressed slightly for the following year, batting .263/.310/.322 while playing in 152 games with 152 hits and 52 RBIs while striking out 54 times and walking 38 times and finishing 2nd in fielding percentage with .962. He played 152 games with the 1966 season, batting .252/.297/.334 with 141 hits and 52 RBIs while striking out 63 times (a career high) and walking 35 times and leading the NL in fielding percentage with .962. For 1967, he would play less games with 137 played, but he batted career highs with .294/.354/.401 with 143 hits and 58 RBIs while walking 45 times with 44 strikeouts and a .963 fielding percentage for 3rd in the NL.

In , he lost his starting third base job to Doug Rader. For 1968, he still played in 124 games (with various positions played dominated by 75 appearances at 3B) while batting .225/.285/.264, having 92 hits and 46 RBIs with 57 strikeouts and 35 walks (he also stole his last base in his career on August 5). On June 9, he, along with teammate Rusty Staub and Maury Wills of the Pittsburgh Pirates, decided not to play in a game between the two teams in light of the assassination of Robert F. Kennedy three days earlier, with Aspromonte stating that “If we didn’t put a day aside, it would hurt me. ... I’ve never had to take this firm a stand on anything before. It’s got to boil down to one thing: how you feel personally. It’s how I felt. My conscience is clear."

Latter years (1968–1971)
He was traded to the Atlanta Braves on December 4 for Marty Martinez, where he would play as backup third baseman or utilityman. He played in 82 games while batting .253/.304/.348 with 24 RBIs while striking out 19 times and walking 13 times. In the ninth inning in the last regular season game against Cincinnati, with 47-year-old Hoyt Wilhelm pitching, he threw out the last runner of the game on a tough play from shortstop to win by one as the Braves clinched the 1969 National League West. Aspromonte reached the postseason for the only time in his career with the 1969 National League Championship Series, where he went 0-for-3 as the Braves lost to the New York Mets in a three game sweep. He played 62 games for the Braves in 1970, batting .213/.282/.236 with 13 strikeouts and walks each. On April 21, he garnered the 1,000th hit of his career while batting against Gary Nolan in the second inning on a single in Atlanta. On December 1, he was traded from the Braves to the New York Mets for Ron Herbel. He started 93 games at third base for the 1971 Mets, twice as many as former regular Wayne Garrett. He played 104 games in total while batting .225/.285/.301 with 77 hits and 33 RBIs with 29 walks and 25 strikeouts (just the second time that he would finish with more walks than strikeouts in a season). In his final game, the last Brooklyn Dodger to play in the major leagues went hitless in three at bats, with an RBI, against the Cardinals' Steve Carlton at Shea Stadium.

After baseball
Aspromonte collected 1,103 hits in his major league career, with 135 doubles, 26 triples and 60 home runs. Aspromonte held the Astros club record for grand slams (6) until Carlos Lee passed him with his seventh in 2011. He resides in Houston, Texas. On January 26, 2019, it was announced that Aspromonte would be an inaugural member of the Houston Astros Hall of Fame and was inducted on August 3, 2019.

References

External links
  
Baseball Almanac
Bob Aspromonte Biography
Slate article on possible Astros Curses
KTRH interview with Aspromonte (2012)

1938 births
Living people
American people of Italian descent
American expatriate baseball players in Canada
Atlanta Braves players
Brooklyn Dodgers players
Des Moines Bruins players
Houston Astros players
Houston Colt .45s players
Lafayette High School (New York City) alumni
Los Angeles Dodgers players
Macon Dodgers players
Major League Baseball third basemen
Montreal Royals players
New York Mets players
St. Paul Saints (AA) players
Sportspeople from Brooklyn
Baseball players from New York City
Thomasville Dodgers players